Lost Command is a 1988 Filipino action film directed by Ben "M7" Yalung, written by Tony A. Calvento, and starring Ramon 'Bong' Revilla Jr., Paquito Diaz, Lala Montelibano, Jenny Lyn, Dave Brodett, Baldo Marro, Robert Talabis, Lolit Solis, King Gutierrez, E. R. Ejercito. Produced by Cine Suerte, the film was released in May 1988.

Critic Lav Diaz gave Lost Command a mildly positive review, expressing that the film largely worked as a vehicle for budding action star Revilla despite being hampered by overly poetic dialogue and incredulously bombastic action scenes. He also gave high praise to the "natural" performance of child actor Billy Crawford.

Cast

Ramon 'Bong' Revilla Jr. as Lt. Roland Briones
Paquito Diaz as Major
Lala Montelibano
Jenny Lyn
Dave Brodett
Baldo Marro
Robert Talabis
Lolit Solis
King Gutierrez
E. R. Ejercito
Edwin Reyes
Ronnie Olivar
Angel Samson
Emil Martin
Janet Bordon
Jean Garcia
Fred Montilla
Ernie Zarate
Pepito Guerrero
Violy David
Rene Yalung
Chuckie Dreyfuss
Rose Ann Gonzales
Isabel Granada
Christopher Paloma
Marichelle Hipolito
Robert Ortega
Mary Grace David
Apple Tiatco
Heidi Paloma
Brian Baylon
Barry Baylon
Billy Joe Crawford as David
Genelyn Magsaysay

Production
Actor Ronnie Ricketts, after starring in the film Target: Sparrow Unit, was originally included among the cast of Lost Command. However, due to a defamatory article he wrote for a magazine on November 20, 1987, about director Ben Yalung and writer Tony Calvento, he was dropped from the project.

Genelyn Magsaysay, an 18-year-old actress, met Bong Revilla's father and her soon-to-be partner Ramon Revilla Sr. during production of Lost Command, and later gave birth to Bong's half-sibling Ram Revilla.

Release
Lost Command was released in May 1988.

Critical response
Lav Diaz, writing for the Manila Standard, gave the film a mildly positive review. He praised the improving acting ability of Bong Revilla, stating that the film's largest achievement is showing his maturation as an action star, while giving high acclaim to child actor Billy Crawford's performance ("He's too much of a natural"). However, Diaz criticized the film's overly poetic dialogue, sappy ending, and far-fetched action scenes, the latter for being too bombastic to be believable ("Thus, you would think that this is now a Watari or Star Wars type of film").

Accolades

References

External links

1988 films
Filipino-language films
Films about child abduction
Films about terrorism
Films set in Davao del Norte
Philippine action films